McPhee Gribble was an Australian publishing firm, based in Carlton, Victoria. It became an imprint of the Penguin Group.

History
Founded by Di Gribble and Hilary McPhee in 1975 McPhee Gribble was the initial publisher of works by significant Australian writers including Tim Winton, Dorothy Hewett, Helen Garner, Rod Jones, Brian Matthews, Murray Bail, Kaz Cooke, Martin Flanagan, John Misto, and Jennifer Dobbs. It entered into a "co-publishing" agreement with Penguin Group in 1983. 

In 1989, it was sold to and became an imprint of Penguin.

References

Book publishing companies of Australia
Publishing companies established in 1975